The 1960–61 Allsvenskan was the 27th season of the top division of Swedish handball. 10 teams competed in the league. Vikingarnas IF won the league and claimed their first Swedish title. IFK Karlskrona and AIK were relegated.

League table

References 

Swedish handball competitions